Brian Price may refer to:
 Brian Price (rowing) (born 1976), Canadian coxswain
 Brian Price (rugby union) (born 1937), Welsh rugby union international
 Brian Price (American football, born 1989), American football defensive tackle
 Brian Price (American football, born 1994), American football defensive tackle
 Brian David Price, American screenwriter and screenwriting teacher
 Brian R. Price, American author, editor, armorer, and publisher
 Bryan Price (born 1962), American former baseball manager of the Cincinnati Reds
 Bryan Price (pitcher) (born 1986), American baseball player